Janvier Ndikumana (born 17 February 1983) is a Burundian goalkeeper who currently plays for Randaberg.

He played his first international game on 21 June 2008 in Rades against Tunisia, he played 21 minutes and to collect a red card through professional foul.

References 

 
 FIFA Profile

1983 births
Living people
Burundian footballers
Burundi international footballers
Association football goalkeepers
Randaberg IL players
Sandnes Ulf players
Ålgård FK players
Expatriate footballers in Norway
Burundian expatriate footballers
Burundian expatriate sportspeople in Norway